The Tumanskaya is a river in Far East Russia. It flows through the Anadyr Lowlands, a region of wetlands and tundra, and into the Bering Sea at the Tymna lagoon.

The Tumanskaya and its tributaries belong to the Chukotka Autonomous Okrug administrative region of Russia.

The sockeye salmon is common in its waters. Belugas are common in the Tumanskaya Lagoon.

There is a small populated place in the area close to its mouth also called Tumanskaya.

References

   
 Sockeye salmon
 

Rivers of Chukotka Autonomous Okrug
Drainage basins of the Bering Sea